Mighty ReArranger is English rock singer Robert Plant's eighth solo album and the second with his band "Strange Sensation". It was released internationally on 25 April 2005, on 9 May in the United Kingdom and 10 May in the United States.

It contains a blend of world and Western music influences (with a psychedelic twist) alongside mystical, oblique, and somewhat cynical references to religion and destiny.

Themes
The Mighty ReArranger is a fate-like entity that controls the affairs of humanity, and the album explores themes of mysticism and fate. "Freedom Fries" is critical of the presidency of George W. Bush and the climate of United States politics after the September 11 attacks.

Release history
A Special Tour Edition of the album was released in France containing a bonus live disc with songs recorded at Studio 104 in Paris on 9 June 2005. The album was re-released in a remastered edition on 20 March 2007, and as a part of the Nine Lives boxset. A special edition of the album sold exclusively in Best Buy retailers features a 44-minute interview bonus disc—A Conversation with Robert Plant—with an interview by Nigel Williamson.

Reception

Mighty ReArranger reached #4 on the British charts and 22 on the Billboard 200.

This album was chosen as one of Amazon.com's Top 100 Editor's Picks of 2005, and was nominated for two Grammy Awards: Best Solo Rock Vocal Performance for "Shine It All Around" and Best Hard Rock Performance for "Tin Pan Valley".

Track listing
All songs written by Justin Adams, John Baggott, Clive Deamer, Billy Fuller, Robert Plant, and Skin Tyson, except where noted
 "Another Tribe" – 3:17
 "Shine It All Around" – 4:03
 "Freedom Fries" – 2:53
 "Tin Pan Valley" – 3:47
 "All the Kings Horses" – 4:20
 "The Enchanter" – 5:27
 "Takamba" – 4:06
 "Dancing in Heaven" – 4:26
 "Somebody Knocking" – 3:47
 "Let the Four Winds Blow" – 4:52
 "Mighty ReArranger" – 4:25
 "Brother Ray" – 1:12
"Shine It All Around (Girls Remix)", a hidden track with "Brother Ray" – 7:31

Remastered version bonus tracks
 "Red, White and Blue" – 3:11
 "All the Money in the World" – 3:12
 "Shine It All Around" (Girls Remix) – 7:31
 "Tin Pan Valley" (Girls Remix) – 6:21
 "The Enchanter" (UNKLE Reconstruction) – 6:50
In this version, "Brother Ray" is by itself on track 12 and the "Shine It All Around" remix is added as a separate track.

Special Tour Edition bonus disc
 "Shine It All Around" – 4:50
 "Black Dog" (John Paul Jones, Jimmy Page, and Robert Plant) – 5:03
 "Freedom Fries" – 5:47
 "When the Levee Breaks" (Kansas Joe McCoy and Memphis Minnie) – 6:28
 "All the Kings Horses" – 4:47
 "Takamba" – 4:49
 "Tin Pan Valley" – 6:28
 "Gallows Pole" (traditional) – 5:39
 "The Enchanter" – 7:55
 "Mighty ReArranger" – 5:43
 "Whole Lotta Love" (John Bonham, Willie Dixon, John Paul Jones, Jimmy Page, and Robert Plant) – 10:31
The band also recorded "Another Tribe", "Morning Dew", and "Babe I'm Gonna Leave You".

Personnel

Robert Plant and the Strange Sensation
 Justin Adams – electric guitar, bendir, tehardant, lap steel guitar, bass guitar
 John Baggott – keyboards, electronica, Moog bass guitar
 Clive Deamer – drums, bendir
 Billy Fuller – electric and double bass
 Robert Plant – vocals, harmonica, production
 Liam "Skin" Tyson – acoustic and electric guitar, lap steel guitar, bass guitar

Technical personnel
 Steve Evans – mixing
 Phil Johnstone – production
Grahame Baker Smith – sleeve design and illustration
 Mark Stent – production

Charts

References

External links

2005 albums
Rhino Records albums
Robert Plant and the Strange Sensation albums
Sanctuary Records albums
Worldbeat albums